The 1993 United States motorcycle Grand Prix was the penultimate round of the 1993 Grand Prix motorcycle racing season. It took place on September 12, 1993, at Laguna Seca.

500 cc race report
It came to be known that Wayne Rainey’s career had been over following his crash in the previous round. As a result, Kevin Schwantz had clinched the 1993 world championship by the end of this round as he finished fourth.

Kenny Roberts commented on Rainey’s retirement, "I’ve thought about it the last week, but Wayne wants to work in Grand Prix racing. That’s going to keep the edge sharp, because he wants to help the team, he wants to help riders, he wants to follow along in what I’ve done. And that’s going to keep me involved. Wayne’s a big, big part of my team, and if he was disgusted with the whole thing, then yeah, it’d probably take a lot of the edge off. And he doesn’t show any signs of that and that’s probably going to keep me involved, otherwise I ... well, you know, I can do anything I want to do, but he’s a driving force right now."

Despite having recently been crowned the world champion, Schwantz was equally concerned about Rainey, remarking, "Everybody’s thinking about Wayne, and we all wish Wayne and Shae and Rex the best, but at the same time, I feel like we raced all season ... to put ourselves in a position to be there to take advantage of any opportunities, any doors that were open. I feel like we still earned it — we weren’t given it."

Rainey himself commended Schwantz on his championship title, saying, "Kevin called. I said to him: You deserve it. And hey, I made the mistake. It doesn’t take anything away from what you did to win your championship."

John Kocinski took the start from Mick Doohan, Schwantz and Alex Barros.

Teammates Schwantz and Barros passed Kocinski.

Barros started to pull away, and at Turn 11, Kocinski tried an inside pass on Schwantz that failed to stick, allowing Doohan to come up as the three went down the straight three abreast. Schwantz stayed to the inside and took the hairpin ahead of Doohan and Kocinski.

Doohan got past Schwantz and hunted down Barros to take the lead. Kocinski also passed Barros.

Doohan's bike hopped a bit on the exit of The Corkscrew, causing him to lose his footing and almost ride his bike side-saddle, only to later clip the hay bales on the left side of the track with his shoulder. He was almost hit by two bikes as he slid into the track, but managed to get up with a bit of pain.

Kocinski's win was Cagiva’s first dry win in GP racing; Eddie Lawson won a wet race last year, but a lucky tire choice was seen as the main reason for the win.

500 cc classification

250 cc classification

Notes

United States motorcycle Grand Prix
United States
Motorcycle Grand Prix
United States motorcycle Grand Prix
September 1993 sports events in the United States